Gumnaam – The Mystery is a 2008 Indian Hindi thriller film written and directed by Neeraj Pathak starring Dino Morea and Mahima Chaudhry.

Plot
Gumnaam – The Mystery starts with an unknown lady (Mahima Chaudhry) driving in a rainy night, who is eventually murdered as she drives, and her finger is cut off.

The story then pivots to one of an aspiring actress, Ria (also Mahima Chaudhry in a double role) who models and acts in music videos. She has her eyes set on making it big in films as a lead actress. During one of her shoots, she meets Dev (Dino Morea), a stuntman, who saves her life during an accident on the set. She's impressed with him; soon love blossoms between them and they are on a romantic high. Meanwhile, Ria is offered a lead role in a film by casting director Rishi Gandhi (Madan) on the condition that she leaves for Shimla the next day. Dev is very happy about her getting the role and sees her off, wishing all the luck.

On reaching the film director's mansion in Shimla, she is introduced to the film's director, Muni Gandhi (Govind Namdeo), who praises her beauty and appreciates his assistant's perfect choice of casting her as the heroine. Slowly Ria begins to see some unusual things around her. The director asks her to give a screen test, however when she asks for a second take she is refused. His assistant Rishi Gandhi delivers the cassette to Remon (Suman Ranganathan), a rich woman in a huge mansion in Shimla, the reason why he did so is not explained. Thereafter, Ria is not allowed to leave the mansion and also not allowed to make phone calls. She notices that she is being spied upon by the casting director Rishi in her bedroom through a mask. Ria later explores the cellars of the mansion and to her horror, finds the dead body of the unknown lady resembling her in a coffin. Her suspicions of the entire set up start building up.

The next day, when she wakes up, she sees that her hair has been cut and finger been removed, exactly like the dead woman in the cellar. Upon confronting the Gandhis, she realises that she is to be used as a pawn of extortion from Remon.

The rest of this thrilling drama unfolds, with Remon's role in the thriller being explained. Dev also becomes involved when he arrives in Shimla to look for Ria. The involvement of a rich uncle, and his eventual murder by Remon further complicates the plot. Eventually, Remon and the Gandhis are brought to justice.

Cast
Dino Morea as Dev
Mahima Chaudhry as Riya / Semon Singh
Suman Ranganathan as Remon Singh
Rakhi Sawant as Riya's friend
Govind Namdeo as Muni Gandhi
Madan Jain as Rishi Gandhi

Soundtrack
The soundtrack was composed by Nadeem Shravan . Lyrics were penned by Sameer.

References

External links
 
 Gumnaam – The Mystery at Bollywood Hungama

Films scored by Nadeem–Shravan
2008 films
2000s Hindi-language films